Bar Timor (בר טימור; born March 2, 1992) is an Israeli professional basketball player, who plays for Hapoel Tel Aviv of the Israeli Basketball Premier League and the Israeli national team.

Professional career
Timor was the Israeli Super League's Rising Star in 2013.

In June 2013, he signed a three-year deal with Alba Berlin. He played in only 10 games with the team due to a season ending injury. In the end of 2013/14 season he parted ways with Alba Berlin.

In July 2014, Timor signed a three-year deal with Hapoel Jerusalem. In 2015, helped the club win its first ever Israeli championship. He was named the Israeli Super League's 6th Man of the Year in 2016. In 2017, Timor won his second championship with Hapoel Jerusalem.
On July 12, 2017, Timor signed a three-year contract extension with Hapoel Jerusalem.

On August 9, 2020, Timor signed with Hapoel Tel Aviv.

Israeli national team
Timor played with the senior Israeli national basketball team at the EuroBasket 2015.

References

1992 births
Hebrew Reali School alumni
Living people
Alba Berlin players
Israeli expatriate basketball people in Germany
Hapoel Haifa B.C. players
Hapoel Jerusalem B.C. players
Hapoel Tel Aviv B.C. players
Israeli Basketball Premier League players
Israeli men's basketball players
Israeli people of German-Jewish descent
Point guards
Sportspeople from Haifa